Assi may refer to:

 Assi Dayan (born 1945), Israeli actor and film director
 Assi El Hallani (born 1970), Lebanese singer
 Jana Assi, Lebanese footballer
 Rabbi Assi, Jewish Talmudist
 Area of Special Scientific Interest
 South Sea Islander

See also 
 AASI (disambiguation)